The City of Lone Tree is a home rule municipality located in northern Douglas County, Colorado, United States. Lone Tree is a part of the Denver–Aurora–Lakewood, CO Metropolitan Statistical Area. The city population was 10,218 at the 2010 United States Census, with an estimated population of 13,082 in 2019.

Geography
Lone Tree is located on the northern border of Douglas County, directly adjacent to Arapahoe County.

The city annexed the territory of the now-defunct University of Colorado South Denver's campus, the former site of The Wildlife Experience, in 2017.

Demographics

As of the census of 2000, there were 4,873 people, 1,848 households, and 1,367 families residing in the city. The racial makeup of the city was 91.55% White, 1.48% African American, 0.25% Native American, 3.69% Asian, 0.04% Pacific Islander, 1.31% from other races, and 1.68% from two or more races. Hispanic or Latino of any race were 4.58% of the population.

There were 1,848 households, out of which 38.7% had children under the age of 18 living with them, 67.0% were married couples living together, 4.9% had a female householder with no husband present, and 26.0% were non-families. 19.5% of all households were made up of individuals, and 1.7% had someone living alone who was 65 years of age or older. The average household size was 2.64 and the average family size was 3.08.

In the city, the population was spread out, with 28.3% under the age of 18, 5.4% from 18 to 24, 34.5% from 25 to 44, 28.0% from 45 to 64, and 3.9% who were 65 years of age or older. The median age was 37 years. For every 100 females, there were 98.4 males. For every 100 females age 18 and over, there were 94.7 males.

The median income for a household in the city was $96,308, and the median income for a family was $109,003. Males had a median income of $90,690 versus $43,125 for females. The per capita income for the city was $46,287. About 1.2% of families and 1.4% of the population were below the poverty line, including 1.5% of those under age 18 and 3.7% of those age 65 or over.

In 2014, the population of Lone Tree, Colorado, was 12,779 people. Lone Tree is part of one of the fastest-growing areas in Colorado, being in Douglas County and South Metro Denver.

Transportation

Highways
Interstate 25 bisects the city, with access from four exits:
Exit 192 (RidgeGate Parkway)
Exit 193 (Lincoln Avenue)
Exit 194 (Colorado State Highway 470/E-470)
Exit 195 (County Line Road)

Colorado State Highway 470 (commonly known as C-470) also bisects the city and, in addition to the I-25 interchange, also provides access to Lone Tree via Yosemite Street.

Public transportation
The RTD Bus & Rail's E Line, F Line and R Line make five stops in Lone Tree (County Line, Lincoln, Sky Ridge Medical Center, Lone Tree City Center, and Ridgegate Parkway–the latter being the southern terminus of all three lines).

The Lone Tree Link operates free bus service along Park Meadows Drive during the weekdays, serving Lincoln Station and four other stops in the city.

Amenities

Shopping
The Park Meadows contains many restaurants, including recognizable brands like PF Chang's, The Cheesecake Factory, and Red Robin. Other dining options include 5 Guys Burgers and Fries, Chipotle, Costa Vida, John Holly's, MAD Greens, McDonald's, Noodles & Company and In-N-Out Burger.

Dining
Lone Tree is home to one of the most famous brunch chains in Colorado, Snooze, which features local ingredients on the menu, and is expanding across the country. Lone Tree's proximity to downtown Denver also makes accessible urban activities and restaurants. Lone Tree has multiple grocery stores and retail establishments, including Costco, Safeway, and Target.

Medical
Sky Ridge Medical Center and ER is situated in Lone Tree. Sky Ridge underwent extreme expansion efforts from 2013-2014. Sky Ridge contains a variety of hospital specialties and is located off of Yosemite near the Charles Schwab complex. For physical health and exercise, Lone Tree has the Lone Tree Recreation Center. The Recreation Center contains an indoor swimming pool, many gyms, and opportunities for classes.

Entertainment
Lone Tree's indoor entertainment options include Bowlero Bowling Alley and Party Venue, iFly Indoor Skydiving Facility, and UAMeadows 12 Movie Theatre.

Lone Tree is home to Park Meadows. With over 185 stores and restaurants, it is Colorado's largest shopping mall and hosts a wide variety of stores, such as American Girl, Apple, Crate & Barrel, L.L. Bean, lululemon, Michael Kors, Nordstrom, and Williams Sonoma. Park Meadows is built in the mountain lodge architectural style. Although it is primarily an indoor mall, it also has an outdoor section called "The Vistas".

Lone Tree is home to a large golf course and hotel area. Lone Tree is made up of many running trails and biking trails for inhabitants and visitors alike. The bluffs at the southern part of the city offer these trails as well as hiking possibilities. Lone Tree is approximately 30 minutes from Red Rocks, which offers more hiking, biking, and running trails as well as a venue for outdoor concerts. Additionally, its suburban location in South Metro Denver makes Lone Tree not far from Castle Rock, which offers other activities.

Notable people
 Gitanjali Rao, scientist and Time magazine’s first Kid of the Year in 2020.

See also

Outline of Colorado
Index of Colorado-related articles
State of Colorado
Colorado cities and towns
Colorado municipalities
Colorado counties
Douglas County, Colorado
List of statistical areas in Colorado
Front Range Urban Corridor
North Central Colorado Urban Area
Denver-Aurora-Boulder, CO Combined Statistical Area
Denver-Aurora-Broomfield, CO Metropolitan Statistical Area

References

External links
 City of Lone Tree official website
 Lone Tree Chamber of Commerce

Cities in Douglas County, Colorado
Cities in Colorado
Denver metropolitan area